Roy Thinnes (born April 6, 1938) is an American television and film actor best known for his portrayal of lonely hero David Vincent in the ABC 1967–68 television series The Invaders.

He starred in the 1969 British science fiction film Journey to the Far Side of the Sun (also known as Doppelgänger), and also played Manhattan District Attorney Alfred Wentworth in the pilot episode of Law & Order.

Career

Early roles
His first primetime role was in "A Fist of Five", a 1962 episode of The Untouchables, as a brother of an ex-policeman (played by Lee Marvin).  Later that year he appeared in a small role as a cowboy named “Harry” on James Arness’s TV Western Gunsmoke (“False Front” - S8E15).

He appeared on General Hospital as the "philandering Dr. Phil Brewer"
 from 1963–65, which was later described as "Thinnes' big break."

In 1964, he guested twice in episodes "Murder by Scandal" and the "Lost Lady Blues" of the 13-episode CBS drama The Reporter.

Later he co-starred as Ben Quick in the short-lived 1965-66 television series The Long Hot Summer, which ran on ABC. During its run he received around 1,500 letters per week and appeared on the cover of TV Guide

The Invaders
During 1967 and 1968, Thinnes starred in The Invaders, a TV series in which he portrayed an architect named David Vincent who accidentally witnessed the arrival of aliens from another planet. Vincent waged a seemingly hopeless one-man campaign against them. The series became a cult classic, leading to other 'aliens vs earthlings' films and TV shows.

His then-future second wife, actress Lynn Loring, appeared in the show's 14th episode, The Panic.

Decades after the unexpected cancellation of the original series, He returned in 1995 as a much older David Vincent, as part of a TV mini-series titled The Invaders (starring Scott Bakula), and a decade later provided audio commentary for the official DVD releases of The Invaders.

The Washington Post noted in 2008 that, although The Invaders "ran for just two seasons ... in 2004, TV Guide placed main character David Vincent at #6 on its 25 Greatest Sci-Fi Legends list."

In 2019, U.S. basic-cable network MeTV began running weekly reruns of The Invaders as part of its popular "Red-Eye Sci-Fi Saturday Night" overnight late Saturday evening/early Sunday morning sci-fi TV series programming schedule.

Post-Invaders
In another short-lived series, Thinnes had the lead role on The Psychiatrist as Dr. James Whitman.

"Manhunter" (in which Thinnes tracks a bank robbery suspect) is a TV Film that was broadcast on British TV in 1972 (with The Man Hunter as its title) but was not shown on American TV until 1976. A similar title ("The Manhunter"), but with a different plot, was used for a 1974-filmed TV movie.

Thinnes guest starred on Twelve O'Clock High, becoming a casualty of war while commanding a B-17 bomber on a dangerous mission. He played an intrepid writer and investigator of the supernatural David Norliss in 1973's The Norliss Tapes, a pilot for an unproduced TV series, and portrayed a suspicious schoolmaster in the TV movie Satan's School for Girls.

He appeared in the disaster films Airport 1975 as the co-pilot, and The Hindenburg as a sadistic SS captain. Thinnes was cast in Alfred Hitchcock's 1976 film Family Plot in the role of nefarious jeweler Arthur Adamson when Hitchcock's first choice, William Devane, was unavailable. Thinnes had already shot several scenes for the film when Devane suddenly became available. Hitchcock fired Thinnes and re-shot all of his scenes. He confronted Hitchcock in a restaurant and asked the director why he was fired. Flabbergasted, Hitchcock simply looked at Thinnes until the actor left. Some shots of Thinnes as the character (from behind) remain in the film.

Thinnes appeared in the 1979 miniseries From Here to Eternity. as Captain Dana Holmes.

During the 1982-1983 season, Thinnes appeared as Nick Hogan in 35 episodes of Falcon Crest. He later played Roger Collins in the 1991 revival of TV's Dark Shadows.  He appeared on One Life to Live as Alex Crown from 1984–85, and as Sloan Carpenter from 1992-95. He also played a lead role in "The Final Chapter," the first episode of the 1977 series Quinn Martin's Tales of the Unexpected (known in the United Kingdom as Twist in the Tale), and in "The Crystal Scarab", a first-season episode of Poltergeist: The Legacy in 1996. Thinnes was once considered by Paramount for the part of Captain Jean-Luc Picard in Star Trek: The Next Generation.

He appeared in the 1988 pilot episode of Law & Order, "Everybody's Favorite Bagman", as District Attorney Alfred Wentworth. By the time the show was picked up in 1990, however, Thinnes was contractually obligated to another TV series (NBC's remake of Dark Shadows), and so his character was replaced with D.A. Adam Schiff, played by Steven Hill. Thinnes made two appearances in The X-Files as Jeremiah Smith, an alien rebel with healing and shape-shifting abilities.

Twice Thinnes appeared on the ABC soap opera One Life to Live playing two different characters.  From 1984-1985, he played the role of "Alex Crown" and from 1992–1995, he played the role of "Gen. Sloan Carpenter". During both of his stints on the show, his characters became a father-in-law to the same character, Cassie Callison.

In 2005, Thinnes co-starred as Dr. Theophile Peyron in the movie The Eyes of Van Gogh about Vincent van Gogh (played by Alexander Barnett, who also wrote and directed) and his voluntary stay in an insane asylum. The movie focuses on Van Gogh's relationships with Dr. Peyron, as well as fellow Expressionist Paul Gauguin, and his brother, Theo.

The New York Times reviewed a 2002 play in which Thinnes had a major role.

Biography
Thinnes was born in Chicago of German descent. After serving in the United States Army as a military police officer, he relocated to California and attended Los Angeles City College.
He was married to actress Lynn Loring from 1967 to 1984. Loring gave birth to their son Christopher Dylan Thinnes on Feb. 12 1969, and in 1974 gave birth to their daughter Casey Thinnes.

Thinnes's third wife, actress Catherine Smythe, is the mother of two of his five children.

In 2005, Thinnes married film editor Stephanie Batailler.

Filmography

Film

Television

References

External links

 Roy Thinnes's website
 
 theeyesofvangogh.com
 Roy Thinnes in The Long Hot Summer

1938 births
Living people
Male actors from Chicago
American male film actors
American male television actors
Los Angeles City College alumni
American people of German descent
Military personnel from Illinois